Laurent Banide (born 26 January 1968) is a French football manager who coaches Monaco's women's side.

Coaching career
Born in Alès, Banide had his first job in management with the youth of AS Monaco FC, as his father Gérard led the first team. Banide was assistant to László Bölöni when on 23 October 2006, after losing seven of ten games at the start of the season, the Romanian was sacked and Banide took over. At 38, he was the youngest coach in Ligue 1. On 4 June 2007, after finishing the season in 9th, ten places above their position at his appointment, the principality club dismissed Banide.

He then coached Umm Salal and Al-Kuwait. In February 2010 he left Al Dhafra Club Abu Dhabi to join Al-Nasr SC, who replaces German colleague Frank Pagelsdorf.

On 10 January 2011, Banide returned to Monaco. He succeeded Guy Lacombe at a club ranked 17th that had been eliminated from the Coupe de France by fifth-tier Chambéry. The team were relegated to Ligue 2, and in early September he was sacked six games into the new season, leaving them second from bottom.

After returning to, and subsequently departing, Qatari side Umm Salal, he was appointed head coach of English League Two side Oldham Athletic on 11 June 2019, signing a one-year deal with the club. He was sacked on 19 September after winning only two out of eleven matches in charge.

In 2022, Banide was appointed head coach of the women's side of Monaco.

References

1968 births
Living people
People from Alès
French football managers
Ligue 1 managers
AS Monaco FC managers
Umm Salal SC managers
Al Kharaitiyat SC managers
Al-Wasl F.C. managers
Al Dhafra FC managers
Expatriate football managers in Qatar
Expatriate football managers in Kuwait
Expatriate football managers in England
Expatriate football managers in the United Arab Emirates
French expatriate sportspeople in England
UAE Pro League managers
Sportspeople from Gard
English Football League managers
Kuwait SC managers
Kuwait Premier League managers
French expatriate sportspeople in Kuwait
French expatriate sportspeople in Qatar
Qatar Stars League managers
Footballers from Occitania (administrative region)
AS Monaco FC non-playing staff